Oleg Vasilyevich Tolmachev (August 19, 1919 – January 1, 2008) was a Soviet ice hockey player and coach.

Early life
Tolmachev was born in Novosibirsk (called Novonikolayevsk in 1919). He served in the Red Army from 1939 to 1946, and saw action in World War II during 1942–44. He was decorated twice, with the Order of the Patriotic War, II degree and medal "For the Victory over Germany in the Great Patriotic War 1941–1945".

Hockey career
HC Dynamo Moscow - 1946–56 as player, 1957–62 as coach.

References
Obituary from Gazeta.ru

HC Dynamo Moscow players
Sportspeople from Novosibirsk
1919 births
2008 deaths
Soviet ice hockey players